Married in Hollywood (1929) is an American musical film. The only footage known to survive is the final reel, filmed in Multicolor, held by the UCLA Film and Television Archive. The film is based on two Oscar Straus operettas.

Plot
A showgirl, part of a troupe, tours Europe where she falls in love with a Balkan prince. The prince's parents disapprove and attempt to put a stop to the romance. A revolution occurs and the prince and the showgirl elope to Hollywood.

Cast
J. Harold Murray as Prince Nicholai
Norma Terris as Mary Lou Hopkins / Mitzi Hofman
Walter Catlett as Joe Glitner
Irene Palasty as Annushka
Lennox Pawle as King Alexander
Tom Patricola as Mahai
Evelyn Hall as Queen Louise
John Garrick as Stage Prince
Douglas Gilmore as Adjutant Octvian
Gloria Grey as Charlotte
Jack Stambaugh as Captain Jacobi
Bert Sprotte as Herr von Herzen
Leila Karnelly as Frau von Herzen
Paul Ralli as Namari
Donald Gallaher as Movie Director
Carey Harrison as Detective
Roy Seegar as Detective

Soundtrack
Dance Away the Night (not to be confused with the similarly titled song from the original London production of Show Boat)
Music by Dave Stamper
Lyrics by Harlan Thompson
Peasant Love Song
Music by Dave Stamper
Lyrics by Harlan Thompson
Once Upon A Time
Music by Dave Stamper
Lyrics by Harlan Thompson
A Man, A Maid
Music by Oscar Straus
Lyrics by Harlan Thompson
Deep In Love
Music by Oscar Straus
Lyrics by Harlan Thompson
Bridal Chorus
Music by Arthur Kay
Lyrics by Harlan Thompson
National Anthem
Music by Arthur Kay
Lyrics by Harlan Thompson

Foreign releases
The film is known as: 
 Brazil & Portugal: Casados em Hollywood
 Denmark: Den wienske Nattergal
 Finland: Häät Hollywoodissa
 France: Mariés à Hollywood
 Greece: Παντρεμένος στο Χόλιγουντ (Pantremmenoi sto Hollywood)
 Hungary: A herceg és a táncosnő
 Italy: Maritati ad Hollywood
 Japan: ホリウッド結婚 (Hollywood Kekkon)
 Latin America & Spain: Casados en Hollywood
 Swedish: Bröllop i Hollywood

See also
List of incomplete or partially lost films
List of early color feature films

References

External links
 
 

1929 films
1929 musical films
1920s color films
1929 lost films
Lost American films
Fox Film films
American black-and-white films
Films based on operettas
Films set in Europe
Films set in Los Angeles
American musical films
Films directed by Marcel Silver
1920s American films